Freya Jones (born 13 November 1993) is an English track and field athlete specialising in the javelin throw.

She became British champion when winning the javelin throw event at the 2020 British Athletics Championships with a throw of 53.12 metres.

References

Living people
1993 births
English female javelin throwers
British female javelin throwers
Commonwealth Games competitors for England
Athletes (track and field) at the 2014 Commonwealth Games
Athletes (track and field) at the 2010 Summer Youth Olympics
British Athletics Championships winners